This list of museums in Warwickshire, England contains museums which are defined for this context as institutions (including nonprofit organizations, government entities, and private businesses) that collect and care for objects of cultural, artistic, scientific, or historical interest and make their collections or related exhibits available for public viewing. Also included are non-profit art galleries and university art galleries.  Museums that exist only in cyberspace (i.e., virtual museums) are not included.

Defunct museums
 George Eliot Hospital Museum, Nuneaton

See also

:Category:Tourist attractions in Warwickshire

References

 Museum Network Warwickshire

 
Warwickshire
Lists of buildings and structures in Warwickshire